John "Red" Beattie (2 October 1907 – 26 December 1990) was a British-born Canadian professional ice hockey forward. He played in the National Hockey League with the Boston Bruins, Detroit Red Wings and New York Americans from 1930 to 1939.

Playing career
Beattie was born in Ibstock, England, United Kingdom, and grew up in Edmonton, Alberta. He played 335 games in the National Hockey League, for the Boston Bruins, Detroit Red Wings and New York Americans. He played junior hockey in Vancouver.

Career statistics

Regular season and playoffs

External links 
 

1907 births
1990 deaths
Boston Bruins players
Canadian ice hockey left wingers
Detroit Red Wings players
British emigrants to Canada
English ice hockey players
New Haven Eagles players
New York Americans players
People from Ibstock
Sportspeople from Leicestershire
Pittsburgh Hornets players
Ice hockey people from Edmonton
Springfield Indians players